A vigilance committee was a group formed of private citizens to administer law and order or exercise power through violence in places where they considered governmental structures or actions inadequate. A form of vigilantism and often a more structured kind of lynch mob, the term is commonly associated with the frontier areas of the American West in the mid-19th century, where groups attacked cattle rustlers and people at gold mining claims; held kangaroo courts; and beat, killed, or exiled those they believed had violated their preferred norms (sometimes on a thin pretext of such, motivated by personal or mercenary gain). As non-state organizations, no functioning checks existed to protect against excessive force or safeguard "due process" from the committees.  In the years prior to the Civil War, some committees worked to free slaves and transport them to freedom.

Assisting fugitive slaves

Between 1850 and 1860, following passage of the hated Fugitive Slave Act of 1850, when professional bounty hunters swarmed through Northern states searching for missing slaves, vigilance committees were set up in several places in the North to assist the escaped slaves. Gerrit Smith called the Fugitive Slave Convention of 1850 "in behalf of the New York State Vigilance Committee". These vigilance committees helped run the underground railroad.

In the West
In the western United States, both before and after the Civil War, the stated purpose of these committees was to maintain law and order and administer summary justice where governmental law enforcement was inadequate. In reality, they were often used by those high in the social hierarchy to attack unfavored groups, including recent immigrants and racial or ethnic groups. In newly-settled areas, vigilance committees promised security and mediated land disputes. In ranching areas, they ruled on ranch boundaries, registered brands, and protected cattle and horses. In the mining districts, they protected claims, settled claim disputes, and attempted to protect miners and other residents. In California, some residents formed vigilance committees to take control from officials whom they considered to be corrupt. This took place during the trial of Charles Cora (Husband of Belle Cora) and James Casey in San Francisco during 1856.

Nature 
Vigilance committees, by their nature, lacked an outside set of checks and balances, often making them a tool of abuse.

In the West, the speed of the vigilance committees and lack of safeguards sometimes led to the innocent being hanged or to their just disappearing. A few committees were taken over by fraudulent individuals seeking profit or political office.

United States vigilance committees 

in 1835, a Vigilance Committee in Nashville, Tennessee, was responsible, after a kangaroo court "conviction", for the public whipping of Rev. Amos Dresser for the crime of distributing abolitionist publications (which he claimed he did not do). The names of all 62 members of the self-appointed vigilance committee were published by the American Anti-Slavery Society, annotating some as "Elder in the Presbyterian Church", and the like.
Philadelphia Vigilance Committee; 1840s & 1850s, abolitionists who worked to subvert the Fugitive Slave Act and helped escaped slaves, including Henry Box Brown
Jackson County, Indiana vigilance committee (a.k.a. the Scarlet Mask Society or Southern Indiana Vigilance Committee), 1868 - captured and hanged 10 members of the Reno Gang
Know-Nothing Riot; 1850s, New Orleans, Louisiana
San Francisco Committee of Vigilance; 1851 & 1856, San Francisco, California
San Luis Obispo Vigilance Committee; 1850s, San Luis Obispo, California,  known to have hung six Californios, as well as engaged in battles around the area.
3-7-77 Vigilance Committee; 1860s-1870s, Virginia City, Montana
Anti Horse Thief Association; 1860s, organized at Fort Scott, Kansas
Baldknobbers; 1880s, Taney, Christian and Greene Counties, Missouri

Other vigilance committees
Biddulph Peace Society; 1876, Biddulph, Ontario, Canada
Whitechapel Vigilance Committee; 1888, London, UK - founded to capture Jack the Ripper.
Vigilance Committee of the Gaelic Athletic Association -  A committee tasked with identifying members of the association who either played or attended "Foreign Games" (predominantly  soccer and rugby union) in contravention of the association's rules. The rule was in place until 1971, up to which point, many GAA players who also wished to play other sports had to resort to elaborate tactics including the wearing of disguises, the use of false names,  and travelling covertly (e.g. in the boot of a car) to attend matches.
 An Oxford Vigilance Committee was formed during World War I in Oxford, UK, a town whose own men of military age had gone to war, and where soldiers were stationed. The Committee ran volunteer patrols of women to discourage, observe, and report on what was perceived as "immoral" behaviour of the town's women. In November 1916, the Committee issued a report "on the Moral Condition of Oxford," warning that the town's streets were "crowded with young girls, whose dress [and] behaviour show that they are deliberately laying themselves out to attract men." Their reports included detailed accounts of casual or adulterous sexual liaisons in the town. Births out of wedlock in Oxford decreased from 1914 to 1925, but the Committee attributed the reduction to "forced marriages" and abortions.

In film and media 
 The Ox-Bow Incident (1943) is a movie directed by William A. Wellman, based on the novel of the same name written by Walter Van Tilburg Clark (1940). The story tells of a group of men pursuing cattle rustlers, capturing and hanging them, and the moral consequences.
 "Ride in the Whirlwind" (1966) is a movie directed by Monte Hellman, written by Jack Nicholson, that tells the story of innocent men, who are thought to be part of a gang, on the run from members of a vigilance committee.

Other uses of the term 
 Vigilance Committee is also a term used by some interest groups who monitor the actions of others.

See also
 Vigilance committee (trade union)
 Vigilante
 Committee of Safety (disambiguation)

References

General references
Roger D. McGrath, Gunfighters, Highwaymen and Vigilantes, Berkeley, CA: University of California Press, 1984. 
 Bancroft, Hubert Howe, Popular tribunals V.1, The History Company, San Francisco, 1887
  Bancroft, Hubert Howe, Popular tribunals V.2,The History Company, San Francisco, 1887

External links

Frontier Justice
Click here for a WorldCat search for American vigilance committee pamphlets published before 1900 available online, many but not all free. Click here for a search that includes pamphlets not available online.

Vigilantism in the United States
Vigilantism